The Belle Brigade is the debut studio album by American band The Belle Brigade, released on April 19, 2011. It was co-produced by them and Matthew Wilder. It was listed as one of the best albums released in 2011 by Paste magazine.

Singles
The first single to be released from the album was "Losers". The follow-up single "Where Not to Look for Freedom" was released on March 22, 2011.

Track listing

Charts

Release history

References 

2011 debut albums
The Belle Brigade albums
Reprise Records albums
Albums produced by Matthew Wilder